The Strelitz Buildings, located at 30 Mouat Street, Fremantle, were built in 1897 for Paul and Richard Strelitz. In October 1994, the buildings were permanently listed on the Western Australian State Heritage Register.

Strelitz brothers
In 1896 Fremantle rate books record that vacant lot 49, 30 Mouat St, was brought by Drummond and Strelitz. On 5 January 1897 plans were passed for the building of a warehouse and offices on the land. Rate books of 1897 show that the site was owned by the Strelitz brothers, and the books record their occupation as merchants and also indicate that the building had been completed. During World War I (1914–18) both brothers were interned as enemy aliens.

Paul Strelitz
Paul Strelitz arrived in Melbourne in 1886, but, following the reports of gold discovery, moved to Western Australia in 1894. Settling in the Fremantle area, Paul Strelitz established himself as a merchant, and was an inaugural councillor for the East Fremantle Municipal Council where he served for a year. In 1904 the Dutch government appointed Paul Strelitz as its consul in Western Australia.

Richard Strelitz
While working for a German shipping company, Richard Strelitz was posted to Victoria in 1892 where he worked for six months before being transferred to Western Australia. When his brother arrived in Fremantle, he left that company and together they established the firm Strelitz Brothers: Merchants and Shipping Agents. In 1897 Richard was appointed as the consul for Denmark; six years later, in 1903, he became the vice consul for Sweden and Norway.

Buildings
The building is believed to have been designed by architect JF Allen, because it similar to some of his other work. Allen also designed other buildings for the Strelitz brothers, in Hay, Murray and William Streets Perth. Approval for the building was given by the Fremantle Council on 5 January 1897 after a proposal was put to the council by Councillor Forsyth with the support of Councillor Instone. The building has a warehouse at the rear with two floors of office space in front. Tenants in the offices included the architect firm of Cavanagh and Keogh who designed a number of buildings in Fremantle.

Notable tenant
Between 1904 and 1906, Herbert Hoover, then a mining engineer for Bewick Moreing & Co, had an office in the building. Hoover later became the 31st President of the United States.

References

Mouat Street
Heritage places in Fremantle
State Register of Heritage Places in the City of Fremantle